

Council of Strasbourg
 

November 1918 was the period of transition when the region of Alsace-Lorraine passed from German to French sovereignty at the end of World War I. During this month, international events were linked to domestic troubles, particularly the German Revolution.

Overview
In the wake of the German Revolution, Marxist councils of workers and soldiers (Soldaten- und Arbeiterräte) formed in Mulhouse on November 9 and in Colmar and Strasbourg on November 10, in parallel to other such bodies set up in the general revolutionary atmosphere of the expiring Reich and in imitation of the Russian equivalent soviets. Under the Empire of 1871–1918, the territory constituting the Reichsland (or Imperial Province) of Alsace-Lorraine was administered directly by the imperial government in Berlin, and was granted some measure of autonomy in 1911. Similarly, the Kaiser was also the local sovereign of the Land, so that Kaiser Wilhelm II's abdication on November 9 involved the fall of the monarchy both at the national and at the regional level, with a consequent legal power vacuum. In this chaotic situation the Landtag proclaimed itself the supreme authority of the land with the name of Nationalrat, the Soviet of Strasbourg claimed the foundation of a Republic of Alsace-Lorraine, while SPD Reichstag representative for Colmar, Jacques Peirotes, announced the establishment of the French rule, asking Paris to send troops quickly.

While the soviet councils disbanded themselves with the departure of the German troops between November 11 and 17, the arrival of the French Army stabilized the situation: French troops put the region under military occupation and entered Strasbourg on November 21. The Nationalrat proclaimed the return of Alsace to France on December 5, even though this process did not gain international recognition until the signature of the Treaty of Versailles in 1919.

The Alsace-Lorraine Soviet Republic (or Alsace-Lorraine Republic of Councils; ; ; ; Moselle Franconian/) was a short-lived Soviet republic created during the German Revolution at the end of World War I in the province of Alsace-Lorraine, which had been part of Germany since 1871.

Disquiet had spread amongst Alsatian soldiers, particularly in early 1918. There was a mutiny by Alsatian troops at the Beverloo Camp on 12 May 1918.

In October 1918, the Imperial German Navy, whose surface ships had largely remained in port after the Battle of Jutland (1916), was ordered to leave port to fight the British Royal Navy. However, the naval troops refused to obey: this led to a sailors' mutiny at Kiel. The mutineers took over the main military port and were quickly joined by workers and the trade unions. The revolution spread quickly across Germany, overthrowing the monarchy within a few days. At that time, about 15,000 Alsatians and Lorrainers had been incorporated into the Imperial Navy. Several of them joined the insurrection, and decided to rouse their homeland to revolt.

On 8 November, the proclamation of a Republic of Councils in Bavaria was aired in Strasbourg, the capital of Alsace. Inspired by this, thousands of demonstrators rallied on the Place Kléber, the main square in Strasbourg, to acclaim the first insurgents returning from northern Germany. A train controlled by insurgents was blocked on the Kehl bridge, and a loyal commander ordered to shoot on the train. One insurgent was killed, but his fellows took control of the city of Kehl. From Strasbourg, the revolution spread throughout Alsace and Lorraine, and similar Soviets were established in Haguenau, Mulhouse, Sélestat, Colmar, Metz, and other cities.

The insurgent seamen established the Soldiers' Council of Strasbourg, and took control of the city. A council of workers and soldiers was then established, with the leader of the brewery workers' union presiding. Red flags flew all over the city, including on the spire of the cathedral. An amnesty was declared, and freedom of the press was proclaimed. Factory workers went on strike, demanding higher wages; the Soviets (councils) raised wages by decree against the opposition of the factory owners. The Social Democratic Party leader in Strasbourg, Jacques Peirotes, then asked the French generals to send in their troops to restore order.

Eleven days later, France occupied and incorporated Alsace-Lorraine. French soldiers under the command of general Henri Gouraud entered the suburbs of Strasbourg on November 22, 1918, strikes were terminated by force, and agitators were arrested. The streets named "Rue du 22 novembre" in Strasbourg and Mulhouse commemorate the return of Alsace to France. The region lost its recently acquired autonomy and reverted to the centralised French system as the départements of Moselle and Haut and Bas-Rhin.

See also
Bavarian Soviet Republic
Bremen Soviet Republic
German Revolution
Republic of Baden
Soviet (council)

References

Daeninckx, D.: 11 novembre 1918: le drapeau rouge flotte sur Strasbourg et l'Alsace proclame la République des soviets..., Amnistia.net, 10 November 2000. In French. URL last accessed April 6, 2006.

Sources
Döblin, A.: Bourgeois & soldats (Novembre 1918), novel, . In French. Part I of a tetralogy; the whole four books are available in German, .
Daeninckx, D.: 11 novembre 1918: le drapeau rouge flotte sur Strasbourg., Amnistia.net, 10 November 2000. In French. URL last accessed April 6, 2006.
Eschbach, J.: Au Coeur de la Resistance Alsacienne. Le Combat de Paul Dingler, Bentzinger, 2005. .
Troester, J.: 22 novembre 1918 : les Français à Strasbourg, in La Grande Guerre Magazine 38, April 2003.

External links

"The Short-Lived Republic of Alsace-Lorraine" , Historical article about the uprising.

History of Lorraine
History of Alsace
1918 in France
1918 in Germany
20th-century revolutions
Alsace-Lorraine
Communism in France
Alsace independence movement
Alsace-Lorraine
German Revolution of 1918–1919